Al-Mashiraq is a sub-district located in Hubaysh District, Ibb Governorate, Yemen. Al-Mashiraq had a population of 4749 according to the 2004 census.

References 

Sub-districts in Hubaysh District